Hillman can mean:

Cars
 The Hillman automobile marque, models of which include:
 Hillman Wizard
 Hillman 14
 Hillman "Sixteen", "Hawk" and "80"
 Hillman Minx
 Hillman Imp
 Hillman Hunter
 Hillman Avenger

Places

United States
 Hillman, Georgia
 Hillman, Michigan
 Hillman Township, Michigan
 Hillman, Minnesota
 Hillman Township, Morrison County, Minnesota
 Hillman Township, Kanabec County, Minnesota
 Hillman, Montana
 Hillman, Western Australia
 Hillman City, Seattle, a neighborhood in Seattle, Washington
 Hillman Creek, a stream in Minnesota

Fictional places
Hillman College, the fictional college attended on A Different World

People 
 Arthur James Hillman (1884–1922), Western Australian engineer
 Bones Hillman (1958–2020), New Zealand musician
 Brenda Hillman (born 1951), American poet and translator
 Chris Hillman (born 1944), American musician, member of The Byrds
 Clarence Dayton Hillman (1870–1935), American businessman and real estate developer
 Colin Hillman (1961–2009), Welsh rugby coach
 Darnell Hillman (born 1949), American basketball player
 Dave Hillman (1927-2022), American bseeball player
 David Hillman (tenor) (1934–2009), English operatic tenor
 Earle M. Hillman (1902–1975), American politician
 Elizabeth Hillman, British professor of biomedical engineering
 Eric Hillman (born 1966), American baseball player
 Elsie Hillman (1925–2015), American philanthropist and donor to the Republican party
 Floyd Hillman (1933–2020), Canadian professional ice hockey player
 George Hillman (1867–1932), British surgeon and MP
 Gordon Hillman (1943–2018), British archaeobotanist
 Gracia Hillman, chairwoman of the U.S. Election Assistance Commission
 Harold Hillman (1930–2016), British biologist
 Harry Hillman (1881–1945), American athlete and Olympic medalist
 Henry Hillman (1918–2017), American businessman and philanthropist
 Jack Hillman (1871–1952), English football goalkeeper
 James Hillman (1926–2011), American psychologist and author
 Jennifer A. Hillman (born 1957), American law professor
 John Hillman (disambiguation), several people
 Larry Hillman (1937–2022), Canadian ice hockey player
 Mark Hillman, Colorado state treasurer
 Nina Hillman (born 2005), American singer and former child actress based in Japan
 Noel Lawrence Hillman (born 1956), United States District Judge
 Reed V. Hillman (born 1948), American police officer and politician
 Ronnie Hillman (1991-2022), American football player
 Shmuel Yitzchak Hillman (1868–1953), Lithuanian-born Orthodox Jewish Talmudic scholar and rabbi
 Sidney Hillman (1887–1946), American labor leader
 Trey Hillman (born 1963), American professional baseball coach
 William Hillman (1848–1921), English bicycle and car manufacturer

Fictional people 
 Richard Hillman, character in British TV drama Coronation Street

Other
Hillman Periodicals, a magazine and comic book publishing company
Hillman Library, at University of Pittsburgh
Hillman Solutions, a hardware manufacturer

See also
 Hillmon
 Hilman (disambiguation)